David Zibung (born 10 January 1984) is a Swiss former professional footballer who played as a goalkeeper. He spent his entire career from 2003 to 2021 playing for Luzern in Switzerland.

Notes

References

External links 
Interview at JustCantBeatThat.com 

 Statistics at Eurosoccer.ch 

1984 births
Living people
Swiss men's footballers
Swiss Super League players
Swiss Challenge League players
FC Luzern players
Association football goalkeepers